Heyran (also Romanized as Ḩeyrān and Hairān) is a village in Gonbad Rural District, in the Central District of Hamadan County, Hamadan Province, Iran. At the 2006 census, its population was 513, in 124 families.

References 

Populated places in Hamadan County